The Ostia Synagogue is an ancient synagogue located in ancient Ostia, the seaport of Imperial Rome. It is one of the oldest synagogues in the world, the oldest synagogue in Europe and the oldest mainstream Jewish synagogue yet uncovered outside Israel.  The synagogue building dates from the reign of Claudius (41-54 AD) and continued in use as a synagogue into the 5th century AD.  

There is a scholarly debate about the status of the synagogue building in the 1st century AD, with some maintaining that the building began as a house only later converted to use as a synagogue, and others arguing that it was in use as a synagogue from the 1st century.

In its earliest form, the synagogue featured a main hall with benches along three walls; a propylaeum or monumental gateway featuring four marble columns; and a triclinium or dining room with couches along three walls.  There was a water well and basin near the entryway for ritual washings. The main door of the synagogue faces the southeast, towards Jerusalem.  

An aedicula, to serve as a Torah Ark, was added  in the 4th century AD. A donor inscription implies that it replaced an earlier wooden platform donated in the 2nd century AD, which itself had been replaced by a newer Ark donated by one Mindus Faustus in the 3rd century AD.

On July 15, 2021, a Bar Mitzvah ceremony took place at the Ostia Synagogue. This was the first religious ceremony at the ancient site since it was uncovered.

See also

 Oldest synagogues in the world

References

1st-century religious buildings and structures
Ancient Roman buildings and structures in Italy
Ancient synagogues
Synagogues in Italy
1st-century establishments in Italy
Ostia (ancient city)